Regina Fritsch (born 1964) is an Austrian actress. She has been a member of the Burgtheater ensemble since 1985 and has been the holder of the Alma-Seidler-Ring since 2014.

Life and career 
Fritsch completed her acting training at the Krauss drama school in Vienna, after having worked for a short time as a truck driver. In 1985, she joined the ensemble of the Burgtheater, where she debuted with the Cäcilie in Nestroy's Freiheit in Krähwinkel. In addition to her stage work, she often plays in cinema and television productions. She portrayed the midwife in Joseph Vilsmaier's Brother of Sleep (1994) and worked in Erika Pluhar's Rosalinas Haus (1992) and Marafona (2001). With her daughter, actress , she was already on stage together in Vienna (2014/15 to 2018/19). In 2019, Fritsch became professor at the Max Reinhardt Seminar.

Awards
 1992 O. E. Hasse Prize for best young actress
 2007 Nestroy Theatre Prize, Best Supporting Role for her portrayal of Chantal in Maß für Maß
 2008 Nestroy Theatre Prize, Best Actress for the role of Nawal in The Burns by Wajdi Mouawad
 2014 Alma-Seidler-Ring
 2015 Kammerschauspielerin
 2021 Albin-Skoda-Ring

References

Further reading

External links 

 
 

1964 births
Living people
People from Hollabrunn
Austrian stage actresses
Austrian film actresses
Austrian television actresses
20th-century Austrian actresses
21st-century Austrian actresses